The life of Joseph Smith from 1834 to 1837, when he was 29–32 years old, covers a period from when Smith returned home to Kirtland, Ohio from Zion's Camp in 1834, until he left Ohio for  Missouri early in early January 1838.

School of the Prophets and Doctrine and Covenants

Temple in Kirtland

In Kirtland, the church's first temple was built. Work was begun in 1833, and the temple was dedicated in 1836. At and around the dedication, many extraordinary events were reported: appearances by Jesus, Moses, Elijah, Elias and numerous angels; speaking and singing in tongues, often with translations; prophesying; and other spiritual experiences. Some Mormons believed that Jesus' Millennial reign had come. Smith may have first practiced polygamy during the building of the Kirtland temple.

Kirtland Safety Society

By mid to late 1837, many Latter Day Saints (including some prominent leaders) became disaffected in the wake of the Kirtland Safety Society banking debacle, in which Smith and several of Smith's associates were accused of various illegal or unethical banking actions when the bank, with the charter held by Smith, collapsed just prior to a nationwide banking crisis. Many critics leveled accusations that Smith was actively misleading KSS members from the beginning of the financial enterprise as it was operating without an official Ohio bank charter and required reserves. Supporters of Smith, on the other hand, hold that the financial institution's collapse was more than partially due to state and federal financial regulations and that the charges against Smith and his associates are at best inflated.

In the meantime, opposition and harassment grew against Smith and those of his associates who supported him. On January 12, 1838 Smith and Rigdon left Kirtland for Far West in Caldwell County, Missouri, in Smith's words, "to escape mob violence, which was about to burst upon us under the color of legal process to cover the hellish designs of our enemies."  

Most of the remaining church members who remained loyal to Smith left Kirtland for Missouri shortly thereafter.

Notes

References

.
.
.
. See also:History of the Church of Jesus Christ of Latter-day Saints
.
. See also: Biographical Sketches of Joseph Smith the Prophet, and His Progenitors for Many Generations

History of the Latter Day Saint movement
Joseph Smith
1834 beginnings
1837 endings